Symplocos longipes is a species of plant in the family Symplocaceae. It is endemic to Mexico.

References

longipes
Endemic flora of Mexico
Conservation dependent plants
Taxonomy articles created by Polbot